Mzimvubu River or Umzimvubu River is one of the most important rivers in South Africa. It is located in the Eastern Cape Province.

Course
The river has its source in the northern region of the Eastern Cape, in the area of Matatiele and Mount Fletcher near the Lesotho border. The Mzimvubu flows with twists and turns generally in a southeastern direction and flows into the Indian Ocean through an impressive gorge known as the "Gates of St John" into an estuary located at Port St. Johns. It is approximately 400 km long with a catchment area of  19,853 km².

Although it is one of South Africa's major rivers, the Mzimvubu and its basin are largely undeveloped. Presently this river is part of the Mzimvubu to Keiskamma Water Management Area.

History
In 1635 Portuguese ship 'Nossa Senhora de Belem' ran aground at the mouth of the Mzimvubu River.

The Mzimvubu River divides Pondoland into an Eastern and Western Pondoland. Formerly the river mouth was used as a harbor, but this activity was abandoned in the 1940s when the estuary became too shallow for large vessels owing to siltation and the fact that the entrance is sometimes obstructed by sand. Presently the estuary is river is navigable only for small craft for about 10 km upriver.

Tributaries
The main tributaries of the Mzimvubu River are the Tsitsa River, the Thina River (Tina), the Kinira River and the Mzintlava River.

Ecology
Some of the fishes caught in its waters are Oncorhynchus mykiss, an introduced species, Barbus anoplus and Anguilla mossambica; others, such as Micropterus salmoides and Cyprinus carpio, are invasive species.

See also 
 List of rivers of South Africa
 List of estuaries of South Africa
 Port St. Johns

References

External links

Mzimvubu River Spring Survey
Key rivers of South Africa
Routes, Eastern Cape - Port St Johns
Is there a role for traditional governance systems in South Africa's new water management regime?

 
Rivers of the Eastern Cape
Internal borders of South Africa